Irache Quintanal Franco (born 18 September 1978 in Reus, Tarragona) is a female shot putter from Spain.

She finished fifteenth at the 2001 Summer Universiade and eighth at the 2002 IAAF World Cup. She also competed at the 2004 Olympic Games, the 2007 World Championships and the 2008 Olympic Games without reaching the final.

Her personal best throw is 18.20 metres, achieved in July 2007 in Barcelona. This is the current Spanish record.

Achievements

References

1978 births
Living people
Spanish female shot putters
Athletes (track and field) at the 2004 Summer Olympics
Athletes (track and field) at the 2008 Summer Olympics
Olympic athletes of Spain
Athletes from Catalonia
Sportspeople from Tarragona
Sportswomen from Catalonia
20th-century Spanish women
21st-century Spanish women